Sophia Charlotte of Hanover (30 October 1668 – 1 February 1705) was the first Queen consort in Prussia as wife of King Frederick I. She was the only daughter of Elector Ernest Augustus of Hanover and his wife Sophia of the Palatinate. Her eldest brother, George Louis, succeeded to the British throne in 1714 as King George I.

Early life
Sophia Charlotte was born in Iburg Castle in the Prince-Bishopric of Osnabrück, where her father held the title of a Protestant prince-bishop. In 1672 her family moved to the new episcopal residence in Osnabrück and finally in 1679 to Hanover, when Ernest Augustus succeeded his brother Duke John Frederick of Brunswick-Lüneburg in the Principality of Calenberg.

During her childhood, Sophia Charlotte visited the Kingdom of France with her mother in hopes of marrying Louis, Grand Dauphin, heir to the French throne. He later married Duchess Maria Anna Victoria of Bavaria instead, but Sophia Charlotte was also proposed as a possible bride for Louis's father, King Louis XIV, after his wife died in 1683. Nothing came of this plan either. A marriage was therefore arranged to Frederick of Hohenzollern, son of Frederick William, Elector of Brandenburg, and heir of both the Margraviate of Brandenburg and the Duchy of Prussia.

Electress and queen
By marrying Frederick on 8 October 1684, she became Electress of Brandenburg in 1688, and after the elevation of Brandenburg-Prussia to a kingdom in 1701, she became the first Queen in Prussia. Her only child to reach maturity became King Frederick William I of Prussia. Her husband was so much in love with her that while he had an official mistress, Catharina Rickert, at his palacein imitation of Louis XIVhe never made use of her services; however, his love for Sophia Charlotte was not reciprocated.

Initially, Sophia Charlotte interfered in political affairs, pushing the downfall of the Prussian prime minister Eberhard von Danckelman in 1697, but soon retired to private life. In 1695, she had received the estates of Lietzow manor west of Berlin from her husband in exchange for further away Caputh. Here she had a Baroque summer residence erected by the architects Johann Arnold Nering and Martin Grünberg, in order to live independently from her husband and have her own court. Frederick was only allowed there by invitation, as on 11 July 1699, when she hosted a birthday party for him. From 1700, she regularly lived there in the summer months. Then called Lietzenburg, it was renamed Charlottenburg Palace after her death.

Sophia Charlotte is mainly remembered for her friendship and correspondence with her mother's good friend and tutor Gottfried Wilhelm Leibniz, whose avowed disciple she became. In addition to German, she spoke French, Italian and English fluently. Following the example set by her mother, she surrounded herself with philosophers and theologians like Isaac de Beausobre, Daniel Ernst Jablonski and John Toland and inspired the foundation of the Prussian Academy of Sciences. She was interested in music, sang and played the harpsichord, had an Italian opera theater constructed, and employed the musicians Attilio Ariosti and Giovanni Bononcini. The composer Arcangelo Corelli dedicated his Op. 5 sonatas for solo violin (Rome, 1700) to her. By some reports she disliked her husband's elaborate ceremonies so much that during their coronation she took pinches of snuff to provide herself with "some pleasant distraction".

Sophia Charlotte was such a formidable personage that when Tsar Peter the Great first met her and her mother on his Grand Embassy in 1697, he was so overwhelmed and intimidated that he could not speak. Both women put him at ease, and he reciprocated with his natural humour and trunks full of brocade and furs.

While on a visit to her mother in Hanover, Sophia Charlotte died of pneumonia on 21 January 1705, when she was 36 years of age.

Legacy
Charlottenburg, today a district of Berlin, the Charlottensee lake in Bad Iburg, as well as the Sophie-Charlotte-Gymnasium in Berlin are named after her.

Issue
 Frederick August of Brandenburg (6 October 1685 – 31 January 1686) died in infancy.
 Frederick William I of Prussia (14 August 1688 – 31 May 1740) married Sophia Dorothea of Hanover and had issue.

Ancestors

References

Further reading 
 MacDonald Ross, George, 1990, "Leibniz’s Exposition of His System to Queen Sophie Charlotte and Other Ladies.” In Leibniz in Berlin, ed. H. Poser and A. Heinekamp, Stuttgart: Franz Steiner, 1990, 61–69. 
 MacDonald Ross, George, 1999, "Leibniz und Sophie-Charlotte" in Herz, S., Vogtherr, C.M., Windt, F., eds., Sophie Charlotte und ihr Schloß. München: Prestel: 95–105. 
 Stiftung Preußische Schlösser und Gärten in Berlin-Brandenburg (Hrsg.in): Sophie Charlotte und ihr Schloss, München, London, New York 1999, 
 Clemens Götze: Das "musische Preußen" Sophie Charlottes. Kunst und Politik am Hof der ersten Königin in Preußen. Grin 2008.
 Karin Feuerstein-Prasser: Die preußischen Königinnen. Piper 2005.
 Renate Feyl: "Aussicht auf bleibende Helle. Die Königin und der Philosoph." Kipenheuer & Witsch 2006.
 Otto Krauske: Sophie Charlotte. In: Allgemeine Deutsche Biographie. Band 34, Duncker & Humblot, Leipzig 1892, S. 676–684.

|-

|-

|-

1668 births
1705 deaths
People from Osnabrück (district)
Deaths from pneumonia in Germany
Consorts of Brandenburg
Prussian royal consorts
House of Hanover
House of Hohenzollern
Burials at Berlin Cathedral
Electresses of Brandenburg
Duchesses of Prussia
Electoral Princesses of Brandenburg
Duchesses of Brunswick-Lüneburg
Daughters of monarchs